Patrick McGuire (born 27 September 1987) is an English former semi-professional footballer who played as a midfielder. He is the current manager of Frickley Athletic, as well as head coach of the Yorkshire football team.

Career
Born in Baildon, McGuire signed with Bradford City aged 11, before graduating through the Bradford City 'Centre of Excellence' and signed a youth team scholarship at the age of 15, ensuring him a full-time apprenticeship as a footballer when leaving school a year later.

At the beginning of March 2006, McGuire was offered a full professional contract with the club. He made his debut in a 2–1 defeat to Scunthorpe United in the Football League Trophy and also made a substitute appearance for Bradford in 2006 with Bradford winning 4–0 in the FA Cup First Round against Crewe Alexandra. He was released at the end of the season and signed for Farsley Celtic.

After making just a couple of appearances in the 2007–08 season, he moved on to play semi professionally with Woodley Sports in March 2008 before joining Buxton. He spent a spell on loan at Glapwell on loan in September 2009

Next he joined Ossett Town, before moving to Frickley Athletic in July 2010 and Wakefield in November 2010. A move to  Guiseley was followed by a return to former club Ossett Town, before signing initially as a player for Thackley afterwards.

In January 2018, McGuire was called up to the Yorkshire football team, a team represented in ConIFA from players in the region.

Managerial career
Following the resignation of manager Chris Reape, McGuire and fellow senior player Mike Garrod took charge of Thackley as joint-managers in January 2018. Due to Garrod's decision to leave in May 2018 after guiding the club to safety in the NCEL, McGuire became the sole manager at the club. During his tenure at Thackley, McGuire reached consecutive NCEL League Cup quarter-finals, as well as a County Cup semi-final, whilst establishing the team as a top-half team in the league. However, following poor performances despite a much-publicised increased playing budget, McGuire parted company with Thackley in December 2022.

In February 2023, McGuire was confirmed as the new manager of Frickley Athletic, a team which McGuire had previously featured for. He was joined by assistant manager Blake Campbell.

In addition to being the first team manager of Frickley Athletic, McGuire is also the head coach of the Yorkshire football team (a role which he has held since June 2022), and since August 2022 is the scholarship head coach at Bradford (Park Avenue).

References

External links

1987 births
Living people
Bradford City A.F.C. players
English footballers
Farsley Celtic A.F.C. players
Association football midfielders
Ossett Town F.C. players
Guiseley A.F.C. players
Wakefield F.C. players
Frickley Athletic F.C. players
Stockport Sports F.C. players
Buxton F.C. players
Glapwell F.C. players
Thackley A.F.C. players
Northern Premier League players
Footballers from Bradford